The 2019 Chevrolet Sports Car Classic was a sports car race sanctioned by the International Motor Sports Association (IMSA). The race was held at The Raceway on Belle Isle in Detroit, Michigan on June 1st, 2019. This race was the fifth round of the 2019 WeatherTech SportsCar Championship, and the second round of the 2019 WeatherTech Sprint Cup.

Background
Similar to the Grand Prix of Long Beach, this event ran in conjunction with the Detroit Grand Prix in the IndyCar Series, with one event held on the same day as the IMSA event, and another held a day after as a double-header.

The Detroit Sports Car Classic is a unique event in the GT Daytona (GTD) class, due to not counting towards the overall championship. It instead only counts toward the GTD support championship, the WeatherTech Sprint Cup, in an attempt to cut costs for the class.

Entries

On May 22nd, 2019, the entry list for the event was released, featuring 23 cars in total. There were 11 cars in the Daytona Prototype International class and 12 entries in the GTD class. The Le Mans Prototype (LMP2) and GT Le Mans (GTLM) classes would not be participating in the event. Due to only counting towards the WeatherTech Sprint Cup, full-season GTD entries Riley Motorsports, Pfaff Motorsports, and Moorespeed decided to forego the Detroit event in favor of pursuing the full-season championship. Meyer-Shank Racing were initially among the teams that decided to miss the Detroit event, until confirming at the eleventh hour a full-time program in both the full-time and sprint championships with both of their cars.

Pfaff Motorsports driver Zach Robichon, who was initially due to miss the event, filled a vacant spot at Park Place Motorsports, replacing Patrick Lindsey, who was preparing for the official test sessions for the 2019 24 Hours of Le Mans.

Practice and qualifying

Qualifying Results 

Results

References

External links

Detroit Sports Car Classic
Detroit Sports Car Classic
Detroit Sports Car Classic